Russell  may refer to:

People
 Russell (given name)
 Russell (surname)
 Lady Russell (disambiguation)
 Lord Russell (disambiguation)

Places

Australia
Russell, Australian Capital Territory
Russell Island, Queensland (disambiguation)
Russell Island (Moreton Bay)
Russell Island (Frankland Islands)
Russell Falls, Tasmania
A former name of Westerway, Tasmania

Canada
Russell, Ontario, a township in Ontario
Russell, Ontario (community), a town in the township mentioned above.
Russell, Manitoba
Russell Island (Nunavut)

New Zealand
Russell, New Zealand, formerly Kororareka
Okiato or Old Russell, the first capital of New Zealand

Solomon Islands
Russell Islands

United States

Russell, Arkansas
Russell City, California, formerly Russell
Russell, Colorado
Russell, Georgia
Russell, Illinois
Russell, Iowa
Russell, Kansas
Russell, Kentucky, in Greenup County
Russell, Louisville, Kentucky
Russell, Massachusetts, a New England town
Russell (CDP), Massachusetts, the main village in the town
Russell, Minnesota
Russell, New York
Russell, North Dakota
Russell Township, Ohio
Russell, Portland, Oregon
Russell, Pennsylvania
Russell, Wisconsin (disambiguation)
Russell County, Alabama
Russell County, Kansas
Russell County, Kentucky
Russell County, Virginia
Russell Island (Michigan)

Extraterrestrial

Russell (lunar crater)
Russell (Martian crater)

Electoral districts
Three defunct electoral districts in Canada are named Russell.

Russell (Ontario electoral district)
Russell (Ontario provincial electoral district)
Russell (Manitoba electoral district)

Ships
, five ships of the Royal Navy have carried this name
, two ships of the United States Navy have carried this name

Other uses

Jack Russell Terrier, a breed of dog
Hertzsprung–Russell diagram, a scatter graph of stars
Russell's paradox, in mathematics, a contradiction discovered by Bertrand Russell
Russell's teapot, in mathematics, an analogy coined by Bertrand Russell
Russell Investments, a subsidiary of the London Stock Exchange Group in Seattle
Russell Indexes, a family of global equity indices
Russell (locomotive), a locomotive of the Welsh Highland Railway
Russell Group, a group of British universities 
Russell Brands, an American sporting goods and clothing manufacturer
Russell Stover Candies, an American manufacturer of confectionery (chocolate and candy)
Russell, a line of automobiles manufactured by the Russell Motor Car Company

See also
Russel (disambiguation)
Russell Island (disambiguation)
Russellville, Alabama
Russellville, Arkansas
Russellville, Indiana
Russellville, Tennessee
Mount Russell (disambiguation)
Justice Russell (disambiguation)